Julio Peralta and Horacio Zeballos were the defending champions, but lost in the first round to Max Mirnyi and Philipp Oswald.

Mirnyi and Oswald went on to win the title, defeating Andre Begemann and Antonio Šančić in the final, 6–7(2–7), 6–4, [11–9].

Seeds

Draw

Draw

References
 Main draw

U.S. Men's Clay Court Championships - Doubles
Doubles